Myurellopsis paucistriata is a species of sea snail, a marine gastropod mollusc in the family Terebridae, the auger snails.

Description

Distribution
This marine species occurs off Papua New Guinea and Fiji

References

External links
 Smith, E. A. (1873). Remarks on a few species belonging to the family Terebridae, and descriptions of several new forms in the collection of the British Museum. Annals and Magazine of Natural History. ser. 4, 11: 262-271
 Fedosov, A. E.; Malcolm, G.; Terryn, Y.; Gorson, J.; Modica, M. V.; Holford, M.; Puillandre, N. (2020). Phylogenetic classification of the family Terebridae (Neogastropoda: Conoidea). Journal of Molluscan Studies.

Terebridae
Gastropods described in 1873